Isabella is an unincorporated community in Worth County, in the U.S. state of Georgia.

History
The community was named after Isabella Worth, the wife of General William J. Worth. A post office called Isabella was established in 1854, and remained in operation until 1900. The Georgia General Assembly incorporated Isabella as a city in 1903.

References

Unincorporated communities in Worth County, Georgia
Unincorporated communities in Georgia (U.S. state)